Uthamapalayam is a town and a taluka headquarters in Theni district in the Indian state of Tamil Nadu. Mullaiperiyar river is one of the attraction for this town.

Temple
Shri Kalatheeswarar Temple, 500 Years old, is a Sivan Temple located in Uthamapalayam, Theni District. Located 29 kms from the Theni. This temple is named "THEN KALAKASTHI" (South Kalakasthi). Kalatheeswarar Temple placing statues of the other god in identical roles as the Temple of Kalakasthi, Andhra Pradesh. East facing Kannappar Shrine, Grahas Raghu & Kedhu also has an individual shrines there. Every Sunday Pooja darshan for Moolavar (Lord Sivan) happens at Raghu time. The temple 's principal attraction is its location on Suruli 's perennial river shore. The most popular spiritual tourist spot to visit. This temple surrounding nature drags our mind into harmony and divinity. Anti-Negativity travels across the body. Please visit Then Kalakasthi (Temple of Kalatheeswarar) at least once in your life. Once you visit this temple your view of Saturn and its attraction will relive your Saturn time.

Shri Yoga Narasimha Perumal Temple
Shri Narasingam Yoga Narasimha Perumal Temple,  800Years old, is a Vishnu Temple located in Uthamapalayam.

Shri Muthu Karuppana Swami Kovil
Shri Muthu Karuppana Swami Kovil, is located in Uthamapalayam.. It is Locally named for the Karuppa Samy Temple at the foot of the Tirukunnagiri hills.

Demographics

 India census, Uthamapalayam had a population of 29,050. 10% of the population is under 6 years of age. Uthamapalayam has an average literacy rate of 73%, higher than the national average of 59.5%: The literacy rate of male and female is 80 and 66% respectively. Uthamapalayam is the headquarters of Uthamapalayam Taluk and Uthamapalayam Panchayat Union.

Government 
Subordinate judge court along with one judicial magistrate court, one judicial magistrate fast track court and one district munsif court.

Climate
Southwest Monsoon and Northeast Monsoon contributes to the rainfall significantly. Being part of Theni it is one of the lush places in Tamil Nadu with high rainfall in most months. The place has a tropical climate with warm weather throughout the year.

Education
Government Higher Secondary School and Mohamed Fathima Girls' High School are very famous in this taluk. A government aided arts and sciences college named H.K.R.H is serving over fifty years. This is the first college in this part of the state after independence.

Adjacent communities

The town is surrounded with small villages to moderate towns like Kombai, Chinamanur, Cumbam, Royapanpatti, Kurumbapatti (Ambasamuthram), Ammapatti, Ellapatti, Thevaram and Bodi.

References

Cities and towns in Theni district